Turid Knaak (born 24 January 1991) is a German former footballer. She played as an attacking midfielder or a striker for Bundesliga club VfL Wolfsburg and the Germany women's national team.

Club career
Knaak started her professional career at FCR Duisburg with whom she won the German Cup and the UEFA Women's Cup. For the 2011–12 season she transferred to Bayer 04 Leverkusen.

On 4 July 2014, she joined Arsenal on a two-month loan, coming off the bench to make her debut in the FA WSL Cup two days later, in a 3–0 win over Chelsea, and four days later, she was named in the starting line up against the London Bees, scoring twice in a 7–0 cup win. She made one more cup appearance in a 4–0 win over Millwall, and then three appearances in the FA WSL, before returning to Leverkusen for the start of the 2014–15 Bundesliga season.

Career statistics

International

International goals
Scores and results list Germany's goal tally first:

Honours
FCR 2001 Duisburg
 Bundesliga Runner-up: 2007–08, 2009–10
 DFB-Pokal: 2008–09, 2009–10
 UEFA Women's Cup: 2008–09

Atlético Madrid
 Supercopa de España: Winner 2020–21

VfL Wolfsburg
 Bundesliga: 2021–22
 DFB-Pokal: 2021–22

Germany U17
 UEFA Women's U17 Championship: Winner 2008
 FIFA U17 Women's World Cup third place: 2008
 FIFA U-20 Women's World Cup: Winner 2010

References

External links
 

1991 births
Living people
German women's footballers
German expatriate sportspeople in England
German expatriate sportspeople in Spain
Germany women's international footballers
Expatriate women's footballers in England
Expatriate women's footballers in Spain
Women's Super League players
Arsenal W.F.C. players
Bayer 04 Leverkusen (women) players
SGS Essen players
FCR 2001 Duisburg players
German expatriate footballers
Women's association football midfielders
Women's association football forwards
Footballers from Essen
2019 FIFA Women's World Cup players